Jong Sara (also Romanized as Jong Sarā) is a village in Owshiyan Rural District, Chaboksar District, Rudsar County, Gilan Province, Iran. At the 2006 census, its population was 477, in 131 families.

References 

Populated places in Rudsar County